

Radio France

The publicly run Radio France consortium controls around 40 radio stations, 31 of which fall under the France Bleu group.

 FIP
 France Bleu (44 regional stations)
 France Culture
 France Info
 France Inter
 France Musique
 Le Mouv'

Public radio independent of Radio France 

 RFI (Radio France Internationale) (controlled by France Medias Monde)
 RFO (Réseau France Outre-mer) (controlled by France Télévisions)

Independent National Radio (by network)

Espace Group 
 Alpes 1 (Annecy, Gap)
 Jazz Radio (Lyon)
 Générations (Paris)
 Là la Radio (Briançon)
 La Radio Plus (Thonon-les-Bains)
 MFM Radio (Paris)
 ODS Radio (Annecy)
 Radio Espace (Lyon)
 RVA (Clermont-Ferrand)
 Virage Radio (ex Couleur 3) (Lyon)

Groupe Les Échos 
 Radio Classique (Paris)

ISA Media Development 
 N'Radio
 Radio ISA
 Radio No1

Lagardère Active 
 Europe 1
 RFM
 Virgin Radio

NextRadioTV 
 BFM Business
 RMC (France)

Nova Press 
 Radio Nova
 TSF Jazz

NRJ Group 
 Chérie FM
 Nostalgie
 NRJ
 Rire & Chansons

Groupe Orbus 
 Skyrock

RTL Group 
 Fun Radio
 RTL
 RTL 2

Groupe 1981 
 Ado FM
 Black Box
 Forum
 Latina
 Ouï FM
 Vibration
 Voltage
 Wit FM

Other private radio stations 
 Beur FM
 Contact
 Mona FM
 Phare FM
 Radio FG
 RCF (Radios chrétiennes francophones)
 Radio Courtoisie
 ExplosHits Radio
 In addition there are five independent stations that broadcast along the length of the major French motorways, principally providing 24 hour traffic information.
Autoroute Info
Radio Atlandes Autoroute
Sanef 107.7
Radio Vinci Autoroutes
Autoroute de Gascogne FM

Independent Local Radio (by region)

Paris and Ile-de-France 
 Aligre FM
 Francestar FM
 Fréquence Paris Plurielle
 Fréquence IDO
 Fréquence protestante
 Ici et Maintenant
 Mamgembo
 Music Box
 Music Capucins
 Radio Alfa - for the Portuguese community
 Radio campus Paris
 Radio Enghien
 Radio Libertaire
 Radio Orient
 Radio pays
 Sport FM
 Vallée FM

Others 
 100% Radio
 47 FM
 Accent 4
 Activ Radio
 Aligre FM
 Alouette FM
 Aquitaine Radio Live
 Beur FM
 Canal FM
 Champagne FM
 Collines FM
 Delta FM
 D!rect FM
 Divergence FM
 Durance FM
 Echo FM
 ECN
 Émotion FM
 Est FM
 FC Radio
 Flash FM
 Flor FM
 FMC Radio
 France Maghreb 2
 Fréquence Grands Lacs
 Fréquence Horizon
 Fréquence Plus
 Fusion FM
 Gold FM
 Grand Sud FM
 Happy FM
 Hit West
 Hot Radio
 Impact FM
 Inside Radio
 Intensité
 Jordanne FM
 K6FM
 Kiss FM (Nice)
 Latina
 Littoral FM
 Logos FM
 Lor'FM
 Lyon 1ère
 Magnum la radio
 Maritima Radio
 Mistral FM
 Mixx Radio
 Mona FM
 Montagne FM
 NOV Fm
 MTI
 Océane FM
 Or'FM
 Plein Air
 Radio Bonheur
 Radio 6
 Radio 8
 Radio Alfa - for the Portuguese community
 Radio Azur
 Radio Bonheur
 Radio Caroline
 Radio Cigogne
 Radio Côte d'amour
 Radio Cristal
 Radio Dreyeckland
 Radio ECN
 Radio FG
 Radio Fugi
 Radio Galaxie
 Radio Galere
 Radio Grenouille
 Radio Jérico
 Radio Latitude
 Radio Liberté
 Radio Mélodie
 Radio Ménergy
 Radio Metropolys
 Radio Mont Blanc
 Radio Orient
 Radio Oxygène
 Radio Rezo
 Radio Scoop
 Radio Star
 Radio Studio 1	
 Radio VFM
 Radio Vitamine	
 RadiOcéan
 Radio RCN	
 RDL Radio
 Résonance
 RBA
 RMB
 RMN FM
 RTS FM
 RV1
 RVM
 Sea FM
 Sun 101.5
 Sweet FM
 Tempo La Radio
 Tendance Ouest
 TFM
 Tonic Radio
 Top Music
 Totem
 Toulouse FM
 Tropiques FM
 Urban Hit
 Variation

Category A Stations 
Non-Commercial Stations
 Judaïques FM, Radio J, Radio Shalom, RCJ (Radio de la Communauté Juive) - Paris (time sharing on 94.8 FM); Religious
 Radio Courtoisie - political
 Radio Notre-Dame - Paris; religious

Internet 
 Francestar FM, France's Hit Music Station...!! FRANCESTAR MEDIA!
 France Vivace, from the Radio France group
 Frequence 3, a Web Radio from Paris
 Plasm, a web radio from an independent group
 Berceuses, a web radio broadcasting lullabies. It is also available to download on the App Store.

Stations that are no longer broadcasting 
 Brioude FM (?-1988)
 Chic FM (1986-1987)
 Hit FM
 KWFM (1989-1990)
 Radio Blagon, an internet radio station promoting francophone groups from the alternative music scene (off air since January 9, 2013)

France
Lists of mass media in France